Michelle Daniela Marquez Dee (born April 24, 1995) is a Filipino actress, model, host and beauty pageant titleholder who was crowned Miss World Philippines 2019. She represented the Philippines at the Miss World 2019 pageant in London, England and finished as a Top 12 semifinalist.

Early life and education
Dee was born in Makati, Metro Manila, Philippines on April 24, 1995 to businessman and former actor Frederick "Derek" Dee and to actress, author, former supermodel, and beauty queen Melanie Marquez, who was previously Miss International 1979. She has one sister, Maxine, and four maternal half-siblings – Miguelito, Mazen, Adam Jr. and Abraham. She is of Chinese descent from her father. Her grand-uncle is Chinabank founder Dee C. Chuan, while her grandfather Dee K. Chiong also served as Senior Vice President of Chinabank; both were immigrants to the Philippines from Fujian, China. Dee spent a considerable time of her childhood in their family ranch in Utah, United States during summers and family vacations. She grew up loving farm animals and enjoying the countryside, both in Utah and in her family's hacienda in Mabalacat, Pampanga, Philippines.

She attended the De La Salle University in Manila, Philippines and graduated with a degree in psychology. In 2021, she completed her certificate program in entrepreneurship essentials from Harvard Business School.

Pageantry

Miss World Philippines 2019

On 15 September 2019, Dee was crowned Miss World Philippines 2019 at the Smart Araneta Coliseum in Quezon City, Metro Manila, the Philippines. The finals night comprised competitions in swimwear, evening gown, and two question and answer rounds. She competed with and won over thirty-nine other delegates, and was crowned by outgoing Miss World Philippines 2018 Katarina Sonja Rodriguez by the end of the event. During the competition, Dee won six special awards: Miss Sportswoman by Fila, Miss GCOX, Miss Best Skin by Cathy Valencia, Miss Bench, Miss Myra E, and Miss Bluewater Day Spa.

In the semifinal question and answer round, host Laura Lehmann asked Dee about the lessons and pieces of advice her mother, renowned top model and Miss International 1979 Melanie Marquez, gave her in her preparations for her first-ever beauty pageant competition. Dee replied:

In the final question and answer round, Dee was asked which invention from the last century she would love to make a comeback. She answered:

Miss World 2019

As Miss World Philippines 2019, Dee represented the Philippines in the Miss World 2019 competition at the ExCel Stadium in London, England, the United Kingdom on 14 December 2019.

During the preliminaries, Dee won both rounds of her group's Head to Head Challenge, earning her a spot in the Top 40 semifinalists. She also placed in the Top 40 of the Top Model competition, and Top 20 in Beauty with a Purpose.

During the finals night, Dee was called in the Top 40, and ultimately entered the Top 12 semifinals.

Miss Universe Philippines 2022

On April 6, 2022, she was announced as an official candidate for the Miss Universe Philippines 2022 pageant. At the end of coronation night, she was crowned Miss Universe Philippines Tourism 2022, second to the eventual winner, Celeste Cortesi.

Miss Universe Philippines 2023

On February 18, 2023, she was announced as an official candidate for the Miss Universe Philippines 2023 pageant.

Modeling 
Her first modeling gig was with clothing brand Bench in 2016. She signed to Click Model Management in New York, after being scouted during a Bench photoshoot.

Philanthropy
Growing up with two of her siblings diagnosed with autism, Dee has been an advocate for autism awareness and mental health education since she was sixteen years old. She has been working with the Center for Possibilities Incorporation, a foundation that helps and cares for children with special needs, and other organizations in spreading more information on autism, assisting those who have the developmental disability—especially the younger people—and creating more awareness about autism and mental health. After winning Miss World Philippines 2019, Dee donated part of her prize money to individuals on the autism spectrum who are in need of medical care and other relevant assistance.

Dee also works with the Autism Society Philippines in bringing attention to the needs of individuals who are on the autism spectrum and their families, and improving access to intervention facilities and services, especially for those in the provincial areas. She supports autism advocacy programs on art, hippotherapy, and inclusive employment for those on the autism spectrum. She became the Goodwill Ambassador for the Autism Society Philippines in January 2020.

Dee is also an LGBT rights advocate.

Personal life 
Her maternal cousin is actress and fellow beauty queen Winwyn Marquez. Dee currently lives with close friend and fellow actress Rhian Ramos.

Filmography

Film

Television

Accolades

Awards and nominations

See also 
Philippines at major beauty pageants

References

External links

1995 births
Living people
Filipino people of Chinese descent
Filipino actors of Chinese descent
Filipino female models
Filipino film actresses
Miss World Philippines winners
Miss Universe Philippines winners
GMA Network personalities
People from Makati
Miss World 2019 delegates
De La Salle University alumni